2007 Malta Open is a darts tournament, which took place in Malta in 2007.

Results

References

2007 in darts
2007 in Maltese sport
Darts in Malta